Rebecca Saunders (born 19 December 1967) is a London-born composer who lives and works freelance in Berlin. In a 2017 Classic Voice poll of the greatest works of art music since 2000, Saunders' compositions received the third highest total number of votes (30), surpassed only by the works of Georg Friedrich Haas (49) and Simon Steen-Andersen (35). In 2019, writers of The Guardian ranked Skin (2016) the 16th greatest work of art music since 2000, with Tom Service writing that "Saunders burrows into the interior world of the instruments, and inside the grain of Fraser's voice [...] and finds a revelatory world of heightened feeling."

Biography
Saunders studied violin and composition at the University of Edinburgh, earning a PhD in composition in 1997. As a DAAD scholar, she studied with Wolfgang Rihm from 1991 to 1994 at the Hochschule für Musik Karlsruhe; Nigel Osborne supervised her doctoral thesis.

Her awards include the Busoni Prize of the Berlin Academy of the Arts, Sponsorship award (1994), the Ernst von Siemens Composers' Prize (1996), the Hindemith Prize of the Schleswig-Holstein Musik Festival (2003), the composition prize of the ARD, and the Mauricio Kagel Music Prize (2015). In 2019 she won the Ernst von Siemens Music Prize (main prize), the second woman, and first female composer to be awarded.

In 2010 and 2012, she taught at the Darmstadt International Summer Courses and was composer-in-residence at the Konzerthaus Dortmund from 2005 to 2006, Staatskapelle Dresden from 2009 to 2010, and Huddersfield Contemporary Music Festival in 2010.

Fabio Luisi and the Staatskapelle Dresden gave the UK premiere of Saunders' revision of traces at the 2009 Proms.

Her music has been performed by notable ensembles worldwide, including Ensemble Musikfabrik, Klangforum Wien, Ensemble Modern, Quatuor Diotima, Ensemble Dal Niente, the Arditti Quartet, Ensemble Resonanz, Ensemble Recherche, ICE, the Neue Vocalsolisten, Ensemble Remix, and the BBC Symphony Orchestra.

Music 
Saunders's music is characterized by limited pitch material and a wide breadth of timbral complexity. She is fascinated with resonance and extraneous noise created by instrumentalists, such as the scratch of a bow change, the thud of the pedals of a piano or harp, and the taps and slides of the left hand on a string instrument's fingerboard. Due to the subtleties and specificity of the sounds she creates, Saunders includes lengthy textual explanations in many of her scores to describe each effect that she wishes the performer to produce.

Much of Saunders's music is based upon a single pitch, or sometimes a small collection of pitches which govern large sections of music. Therefore, development and elaboration are determined more by sonority and texture rather than traditional voice leading. However, she does sometimes include “quasi-diatonic” pitch collections, which suggest a more traditional context than that of her music based on single notes.

Rebecca Saunders has also explored physical space in her music. In an interview for the Huddersfield Contemporary Music Festival, she described her music thus:

By describing the “mass and weight” of her music, and comparing her art to that of a sculpture, she is attempting to bring sound into a physical plane. Additionally, in works like chroma, she invites the listener to wander around and explore the influence of physical space on the audience's experience.

Works

Behind the Velvet Curtain (1991–92), for trumpet, harp, piano and cello
Trio (1992), for clarinet, violoncello and piano
Mirror, mirror on the wall (1993–94), for piano
The Under Side of Green (1994), for clarinet, violin and piano
Molly's Song 1—crimson (1995), for twelve soloists, metronome, whistle, music box and conductor
Molly's Song 2—a shade of crimson (1995), for voice, viola, flute, steel string guitar and shortwave radios
Molly's Song 3—shades of crimson (1995), for alto flute, viola, steel-stringed guitar, four radios and music box
Duo (1996), for violin and piano
Into the Blue (1996), for clarinet, bassoon, cello, double bass, piano and percussion  
dichroic seventeen (1996), for piano, two percussionists, two double basses, accordion and electric guitar
G and E on A (1996–97), for orchestra and 27 music boxes
String Quartet (1997)
QUARTET (1998), for piano, B-flat clarinet/bass clarinet, double bass and accordion
cinnabar (1999), for violin, trumpet and ensemble
duo four – two exposures (2000–01), for solo trumpet, solo percussion and orchestra
albescere (2001), for twelve instruments and five voices
Chroma (I–XIX) (2003–13), for twelve to sixteen performers  
vermilion (2003), for clarinet, electric guitar and cello
insideout (2003), for woodwinds, brass, timpani, percussion, piano, strings, accordion, electric guitar — music for the choreographic installation by Sasha Waltz
blaauw (2004), for double-bell trumpet
Choler (2004), for piano duo
Miniata (2004), for accordion, piano, choir and orchestra
Crimson (2004–05), for piano
Fury I (2005), for double bass
Blue and Gray (2005), for two double basses
rubricare (2005), for strings and organ
rubricare (2005), for baroque string orchestra
A Visible Trace (2006), for seven soloists and conductor
Traces (2006–09), for orchestra
Soliloquy (2007), for six voices a cappella
Stirrings Still I (2007), for alto flute, oboe, clarinet, piano and bowed crotales
Stirrings Still II (2008), for six players: alto flute, oboe, clarinet in A, crotales, piano and double bass
Company (2008), for counter tenor, trumpet, violoncello, accordion and electric guitar
Disclosure (2008), for five players: bass clarinet (doubling clarinet), trumpet, trombone, piano and violin
murmurs (2009), Collage for ten players 
Fury II (2010), Concert for double bass and ensemble
To and fro (2010), for violin and oboe
Stratum (2010), for orchestra
Stasis I (2011), a special collage for 16 soloists
Stasis collective (2011–16), a special collage for 23 musicians
Stasis II (2011–14), quartet for trumpet, oboe, percussion and piano
Caerulean (2011), for bass clarinet 
Dialogue (2011), for viola and percussion 
Neither (2011), for 2 double bell trumpets
Stirrings (2011), for nine players: alto flute, clarinet in A (boehm system), oboe, crotales (top octave with 2 violoncello bows), piano (grand), harp, violin, violoncello (IV scordatura), double bass (with five strings, V scordatura)
Still (2011), for violin and orchestra
Ire (2012), Concerto for violoncello, strings and percussion
Fletch (2012), for string quartet
Shadow (2013), for piano
...of waters making moan (2013), for accordion
Solitude (2013), for violoncello
Void (2013–14), for two percussionists and chamber orchestra
Alba (2014), for trumpet und orchestra
Six for AK (2015), for 2 percussionists, piano (2 players), guitar (steel strings) and harp
White (2015, revised 2016), for double bell trumpet solo
Skin (2016), for soprano and ensemble
Myriad (2015–2016) sound installation of 2464 identical musical box mechanisms
Still / Aether/ Alba (2020)
Solo - Klangforum Wien (2021)

References

External links
 
 Rebecca Saunders interviewed at the time of the premiere of albescere, Ensemble Modern (in English)
 SoundCloud profile
 

1967 births
Living people
20th-century classical composers
21st-century classical composers
Women classical composers
English classical composers
Alumni of the University of Edinburgh
20th-century English composers
Members of the Academy of Arts, Berlin
Ernst von Siemens Composers' Prize winners
Ernst von Siemens Music Prize winners
20th-century English women musicians
21st-century British composers
21st-century English women musicians
20th-century women composers
21st-century women composers